Acanthodium is a genus of mosses belonging to the family Sematophyllaceae.

The species of this genus are found in Southerneast Asia.

Species:

Acanthodium lancifolium 
Acanthodium rigidum 
Acanthodium trismegistum

References

Hypnales
Moss genera